Falcaria bilineata, the two-lined hooktip moth, is a moth in the family Drepanidae. It was described by Packard in 1864. It is found in North America, where it has been recorded from Newfoundland to New Jersey, west to Oregon and north to British Columbia. The habitat consists of deciduous woodlands.

The wingspan is 28–33 mm. The forewings are light brown to orangish-yellow. The ante- and postmedial lines are brown, straight and parallel and the reniform spot has the form of a black dot. The hindwings are white or pale yellow with a small indistinct discal spot and a thin brown terminal line. Adults are on wing from April to September in two generations per year.

The larvae feed on the leaves of Alnus and Betula species. The larva have a purplish or reddish-brown body, mottled with yellow. Pupation takes place in a cocoon made within a folded leaf.

Subspecies
Falcaria bilineata bilineata
Falcaria bilineata rampartensis (Barnes & Benjamin, 1922)

References

Moths described in 1864
Drepaninae